Gogana turbinifera is a moth in the family Drepanidae first described by Warren in 1922. It is found on Borneo and possibly Peninsular Malaysia.

References

Moths described in 1922
Drepaninae